East Frisian Low German or East Frisian Low Saxon is one of the Northern Low Saxon dialects, a West Low German dialect spoken in the East Frisian peninsula of northwestern Lower Saxony. It is used quite frequently in everyday speech there. About half of the East Frisian population in the coastal region uses the language. A number of individuals, despite not being active speakers of Low Saxon, are able to understand it to some extent. However, both active and passive language skills are in a state of decrease.

East Frisian Low Saxon is not to be confused with the Eastern Frisian language; the latter, spoken by about 2,000 individuals in the Saterland region, is a Frisian language, not Low German.

There are several dialects in East Frisian Low Saxon. There are two main groups of dialects. The dialects in the east, called Harlinger Platt, are strongly influenced by Northern Low Saxon of Oldenburg. The western dialects are closer to the Low Saxon Language spoken in the Dutch province of Groningen, Gronings.

East Frisian Low Saxon differs from Northern Low Saxon in several aspects, which are often linked to Frisian heritage. The language originally spoken in East Frisia and Groningen was Frisian, so the current Low Saxon dialects of East Frisia, as part of the Friso-Saxon dialects, build on a Frisian substrate which has led to a large amount of unique lexical, syntactic, and phonological items which differ from other Low Saxon variants. Some Old Frisian vocabulary is still in active speech today.

East Frisian features frequent use of diminutives, as in the Dutch language, e.g. kluntje ‘lump of rock sugar’. In many cases, diminutives of names, especially female ones, have become names of their own. For example: Antje (from Anna), Trīntje (from Trina = Katharina) etc.

The dialects spoken in East Frisia are closely related to those spoken in the Dutch province of Groningen (Grunnegs, Grünnigs) and in Northern Drenthe (Noordenvelds). The biggest difference seems to be that of loanwords (from Dutch or German, resp.).

The standard greeting is Moin (moi in Gronings), used 24 hours a day.

External links
Low Saxon Office at the Ostfriesische Landschaft
Ostfreeske Taal
Diesel - dat oostfreeske Bladdje, the trilingual East Frisian newspaper
Project for an alternative Orthography
Dictionary and Grammar

Notes

Northern Low Saxon dialects
German dialects
Frisian languages
Culture of Lower Saxony